Horses, Cattle and Coyotes is the eighth album from the Sons of the San Joaquin.

Track listing

Personnel

Sons of the San Joaquin

Jack Hannah
Joe Hannah
Lon Hannah

Additional personnel

Rich O'Brien - acoustic lead and rhythm guitars
Randy Elmore - rhythm guitar and fiddle
Dale Morris, Jr. - fiddle
Tim Alexander - accordions, bajo sexto
Mark Abbott - acoustic bass
James Perkins - marimba
Kevin Bailey - banjo
Bill Atwood - trumpet
Greg Hardy - percussion
Ray Appleton - harmonica

Production

Rich O'Brien - producer
Rodger Glaspey - executive producer
Recorded at: 
Eagle Audio, Ft. Worth, TX
Mike Talmadge - engineer
Mixed by:
Rich O'Brien
Mike Talmadge
Re-Mixed by:
Mike Talmadge
Rich O'Brien
Mastered at:
Capitol Records, Hollywood, CA
Robert Vosgien - mastering
Pete Papageorges - mastering
Marc Blake - photography

External links
Official site

1999 albums
Sons of the San Joaquin albums